Svilengrad is a town in Haskovo Province, south-central Bulgaria, situated at the border of Bulgaria, Turkey and Greece. It is the administrative centre of the homonymous Svilengrad Municipality.

Geography 
Svilengrad is close to the road borders of Greece and Turkey (supposedly one of the largest road customs in Europe).  Svilengrad is located ESE of Sofia and Plovdiv, South of Varna and Burgas, West of Edirne and North of the nearest Greek community Ormenio and Alexandroupoli in Greece.  There is a higher level of employment than in surrounding villages. Most people work for customs and border related industries e.g. TIR servicing, hotels, border police, etc. The town centre has a pedestrianized high street mostly filled with cafes, bars, phone shops and hotels. The town has 3 DVD rental shops, two cinemas and a library.  The Maritsa river flows through Svilengrad.  The Evros regional unit of Greece is bordered to the south.  The Rhodope mountains lie to the west and southwest.  The area to the southwest is famous for its fruit trees and a moderate climate all year long.

History
During Ottoman times, the town's name was Cisr-i Mustafapaşa, meaning "Bridge of Mustapha Pasha". In 1529, the Old Bridge over the Maritsa, one of the symbols of the town, was erected. The town was ceded to Bulgaria in 1912 after the First Balkan War.

The favorable natural conditions in the Svilengrad region and its strategic geographical location are the reason why it has been inhabited since ancient times. According to Anastas Razboynikov, the oldest traces of human life date back to the end of the Neolithic and Stone Age. During the Bronze and Iron Ages the lands around today's Svilengrad were inhabited by the Thracian tribe Odrysians. Traces of settlements, tombs, sanctuaries, dolmens and others have remained from the time of the Thracians. In the old neighborhood of Kanaklia there was a place Mogilata, named after a large mound, in the vicinity of which were found the remains of chariots. Anastas Razboynikov's observations were confirmed in 2003-2004 during the rescue excavations along the route of the Trakia Motorway on the hill above the Kanaklia neighborhood, where a pit sanctuary from the Iron Age was discovered.

Middle Ages 
The region was a bustling crossroads and an arena of constant wars even after the establishment of the Bulgarian state. Under Khan Krum (803-814), Bulgarian troops often ravaged areas of the empire, according to the triumphal columns of Pliska for the conquest of the fortresses of Scutarion (now Shtit), Provat and others.

This region is associated with one of the greatest battles in medieval Bulgarian history. In 1205, Kaloyan's troops inflicted the first major defeat on the hitherto invincible Latin army led by Emperor Baldwin. It is believed that the site of the battle was north of Adrianople, at the foot of Bukelon Fortress.

In 1371, on the opposite right bank of the Maritsa River near Chermen, the Battle of Chernomen took place between the troops of Sultan Murad I and the Christian forces under the command of King Vukašin and Despot Uglješa, which ended in catastrophic defeat for the Christians.

In 1433, the Burgundian pilgrim Bertrand de la Broquierre passed through here, then the first armor bearer of Philip the Good, Duke of Burgundy, who traveled to the Holy Sepulcher and back to explore the possibilities of a new crusade. Brokier describes how on the first day of the journey from Adrianople up the Maritsa River he and his comrades, numbering 10 horses, were transported in such a raft on March 12, 1433. Among the passengers was the Milan ambassador to the Turkish sultan in Adrianople.

In 1529 a bridge was built on the Maritsa River, representing a significant facility for its time. The bridge now connects the two parts of Svilengrad. A new settlement appeared around the bridge - Jesir Mustafa Pasha, which became a town in the second half of the 16th century.

Revival 
During the Ottoman rule, the population of the city selflessly fought to preserve their national identity. In 1847 a school for secular sciences was built. The patriarch of Bulgarian literature Ivan Vazov taught in this school from 1872 to 1873. In 1870 the Zvezda Chitalishte opened its doors. Another Revival teacher - Peter Stanchov, became the godfather of the city. The settlement began to be called so only in 1913.

On the way to Constantinople, famous Bulgarian revolutionaries, educators and revivalists - Georgi Rakovski, Petko Slaveykov, Hristo G. Danov, Dragan Tsankov, Konstantin Velichkov - passed and stayed here. Vasil Levski also came to the city. Here, in 1871, he founded a secret revolutionary committee. On January 8, 1878, Russian troops, commanded by General Alexander Strukov, entered Svilengrad. A year later, after the Berlin Treaty, the city was left under Turkish rule.34 years later, during the First Balkan War, Svilengrad was liberated and moved back to Bulgaria. This happened on October 5, 1912, after the Bulgarian army captured Sheinovets peak in the Rhodopes. During the Balkan Wars, the first military airport near Svilengrad was equipped.
The newly liberated city rejoices for a short time. It was ruined and burned house by house in the summer of 1913, when Turkey intervened in the Inter-Allied War against Bulgaria. The city was finally liberated at the end of September 1913, after a new peace treaty was concluded in Constantinople between Bulgaria and Turkey. According to the defined new border, Svilengrad remains in Bulgaria. Its returned inhabitants revived the city from the ashes and rebuilt it.

Sports

FC Svilengrad 1921

Notable people
Binka Zhelyazkova – film director
Hristo Atanassov – politician
Ognyana Dusheva – sprint canoer
Milko Kalaydzhiev – singer
Rıza Tevfik Bölükbaşı – Turkish philosopher, poet and politician
Nikolay Mihaylov – Bulgarian cyclist

Honours
Svilengrad Peninsula on Davis Coast, Antarctica is named after the town, in connection with its pioneering role in the world aerial warfare history.

References

External links
 e-svilengrad - Svilengrad News
 Svilengrad municipality official website
 Svilengrad municipality - town and villages, populations, maps, locations, sizes, etc.
 The news portal of Svilengrad

Towns in Bulgaria
Populated places in Haskovo Province
Bulgaria–Greece border crossings